Alejandro "Álex" Urtasun Uriz (born April 30, 1984) is a Spanish professional basketball player for Força Lleida of the LEB Oro. His twin brother, Txemi Urtasun, is also a professional basketball player.

Urtasun signed with Estudiantes on February 16, 2022.

References

External links
Spanish League Profile 
FIBA Profile
Eurocup Profile
Eurobasket.com Profile
Draftexpress.com Profile

1984 births
Living people
AB Castelló players
Baloncesto Fuenlabrada players
Basket Navarra Club players
Basket Zaragoza players
Cantabria Baloncesto players
CB Breogán players
CB Lucentum Alicante players
CB Murcia players
Gipuzkoa Basket players
Liga ACB players
Real Betis Baloncesto players
Força Lleida CE players
Shooting guards
SLUC Nancy Basket players
Spanish expatriate basketball people in France
Spanish men's basketball players
Valencia Basket players
Sportspeople from Pamplona
Twin sportspeople
Spanish twins